Ryan Ramos is a Filipino actor, TV host and sportscaster. Ramos is currently the host of Sports 37, UNTV's sports magazine program and main host of UNTV Cup.

Filmography

Television

Film

Awards and nominations

References

External links

Star Magic
Living people
Filipino male child actors
1996 births
People from Davao City
Male actors from Davao del Sur